The National Youth Orchestras of Scotland (NYOS) caters for students aged between 8 and 25, through orchestras, jazz bands, training ensembles and outreach programmes.

In addition to organising residential training courses, rehearsals and national and international concert tours, NYOS also provides music workshops in communities throughout Scotland.

The National Youth Orchestras of Scotland are a full member of the European  UNION of National Youth Orchestras.

NYOS Symphony Orchestra (The National Youth Orchestra of Scotland) 
NYOS Symphony Orchestra (The National Youth Orchestra of Scotland) is the flagship orchestra of NYOS. Founded in 1979, it is a symphony orchestra for musicians aged 25 and under. Following its two residential courses the ensemble performs during spring and summer in a variety of venues and festivals as part of the Orchestra's annual national and international tours.

Auditions for entry to NYOS orchestras are held annually throughout Scotland, attracting over 500 applicants each year.

Senior Orchestra
NYOS Senior Orchestra is for musicians aged 13 and over, and is the second stage on the classical pathway for aspiring members of NYOS Symphony Orchestra (The National Youth Orchestra of Scotland). Annual membership of NYOS Senior Orchestra includes residential courses in both spring and summer, followed by the opportunity to experience the thrill of orchestral performance at top venues across Scotland.

Junior Orchestra
NYOS Junior Orchestra is for young musicians aged 8 and over. This is also the first step of the pathway for aspiring members of NYOS Senior Orchestra and NYOS Symphony Orchestra (The National Youth Orchestra of Scotland). NYOS Junior Orchestra provides younger students with the opportunity to perform large-scale symphonic repertoire at top class venue.  Annual membership of NYOS Junior Orchestra includes residential courses in both spring and summer, followed by the opportunity to perform at venues across Scotland.

NYOS Training Ensembles 
NYOS Training Ensembles are designed for younger players (around the age of 8–14) to prepare them for entry into a NYOS orchestra. The training ensembles not only focus on learning repertoire, but also on essentials such as ensemble skills, listening, posture and musicianship along with advice on audition preparation.

NYOS Camerata 
NYOS Camerata is the pre-professional chamber ensemble of NYOS. It comprises current senior and past members of NYOS Symphony Orchestra. T-Projects include tutoring, delivering workshops, working within Scottish communities, learning about various genres and working with professional musicians. Membership of NYOS Camerata is by invitation only.

NYOS Futures
NYOS Futures is the contemporary ensemble of NYOS. Players are drawn from the Symphony and Jazz Orchestras and membership is by invitation only. This ensemble aims to introduce young musicians and audiences to new music. Some projects include compositions written especially for the ensemble and repertoire can include classical, jazz or cross-genre music.

NYOS Jazz Orchestra (National Youth Jazz Orchestra of Scotland)
NYOS Jazz Orchestra (The National Youth Jazz Orchestra of Scotland), under the direction of Malcolm Edmonstone and Andrew Bain, performs throughout the UK at jazz venues and festivals.

NYOS Jazz Collective
NYOS Jazz Collective is a small, flexible ensemble, comprising musicians invited from the NYOS jazz flagship ensemble and sometimes from NYOS Camerota. They play professional repertoire with improvisation at its core. The ensemble has performed music written by its members and has appeared on concert tours and at jazz festivals with leading international soloists.

Membership of Jazz Collective is by invitation only.

See also 
 National Youth Orchestra of Great Britain
 National Youth Orchestra of Wales
 Music Schools in Scotland
 List of youth orchestras

References 

Music education organizations
Musical groups established in 1979
Music organisations based in Scotland
Scottish youth orchestras
National youth orchestras
European youth orchestras
1979 establishments in Scotland
Arts organisations based in Scotland